Land and Property Gazetteer may refer to:

 National Land and Property Gazetteer, an address infrastructure in England and Wales
 Local Land and Property Gazetteer, an address database maintained by each local authority in the United Kingdom

See also
 National Address Gazetteer
 National Street Gazetteer